Zinc finger protein 175 is a protein that in humans is encoded by the ZNF175 gene.

References

Further reading 

Human proteins